Ghöch Pass is a mountain pass in the canton of Zürich in Switzerland.

References

Mountain passes of Switzerland
Mountain passes of the canton of Zürich